Route 286 is a minor state highway in northern Connecticut running entirely within the town of Ellington. It serves the community of Windermere Village.

Route description
Route 286 begins as Pinney Street at an intersection with Route 74 in southern Ellington. It heads north  to the Ellington town center, passing by the residential community of Windermere Village along the way. In Ellington center, Route 286 turns east along Main Street, approaching but not intersecting Route 140 at the town green. Route 286 continues east another  before ending at an intersection with Route 83.

History
Most of modern Route 286 was first designated as a state highway at the beginning of 1963 as part of the Route Reclassification Act. The Main Street portion of Route 286 was originally part of Route 140. Route 140 was extended eastward in 1963 and was relocated to use Maple Street, with the Main Street portion becoming part of Route 286. Route 286 has had no significant changes since.

Junction list

References

External links

286
Transportation in Tolland County, Connecticut
Ellington, Connecticut